George Washington Morse (April 1830 – December 23, 1915) was an American politician in the state of Washington. He served in the Washington House of Representatives.

References

Republican Party members of the Washington House of Representatives
1830 births
1915 deaths
19th-century American politicians